The 2001–02 Hellenic Football League season was the 49th in the history of the Hellenic Football League, a football competition in England.

Premier Division

The Premier Division featured 18 clubs which competed in the division last season, along with four new clubs:
Bishop's Cleeve, promoted from Division One West
Gloucester United, promoted from Division One West
Henley Town, promoted from Division One East
Southall Town, promoted from Division One East

League table

Division One East

Division One East featured 15 clubs which competed in the division last season, along with two clubs:
Bisley Sports, joined from the Surrey County Premier League
Milton United, relegated from the Premier Division

Also, Harrow Hill Rovers changed name to Hounslow Borough.

League table

Division One West

Division One West featured 13 clubs which competed in the division last season, along with five new clubs:
Chipping Norton Town, joined from the Oxfordshire Senior League
Hook Norton, joined from the Oxfordshire Senior League
Pewsey Vale, transferred from the Western League
Shrivenham, joined from the North Berks League
Winterbourne United, joined from the Gloucestershire County League

League table

References

External links
 Hellenic Football League

2001-02
8